MV Coastal Celebration is the third and final  ship to be delivered to BC Ferries. The class comprises some of the largest double-ended ferries in the world. The vessel completed construction in 2008 and entered service the same year.

Description
They are among the largest double-ended ferries in the world.

The vessel has a capacity of 1,604 crew and passengers and 310 vehicles. Coastal Celebrations amenities include a Pacific Buffet, a Coastal Cafe, a Coast Cafe Express, a Seawest Lounge, a Passages Gift Shop, a Kids Zone, a Video Zone, a pet area, work/study stations, elevators, and accessible washrooms.

Service history
The third and final vessel in its class, Coastal Celebrations keel was laid down on September 3, 2007 by Flensburger Schiffbau-Gesellschaft of Flensburg, Germany with the yard number 735. The vessel was launched on December 14, 2007 and completed construction on May 9, 2008. Coastal Celebration was named as such by BC Ferries "to reflect the anticipated celebration that BC Ferries and its customers will have". The vessel left Flensburg on May 9, 2008, made a promotional stop in London, England on May 12, 2008, transited the Panama Canal on June 1 and arrived in British Columbia on June 18. Coastal Celebration was assigned the Swartz Bay-Tsawwassen ferry route servicing Vancouver and Victoria, British Columbia.

An investigation found that this was due to an error on the bridge. No one was hurt in the incident. However, damage to Coastal Celebration and the berth at Swartz Bay cost CAN$470,000. On November 4, 2015, while the ship was sailing from Tsawwassen to Swartz Bay, a man launched one of Coastal Celebrations 100-person life rafts and jumped overboard. The man then swam to Galiano Island while the ferry recovered the life raft and launched rescue craft to recover the man. The man was later arrested on the island. On December 17, 2018, Coastal Celebration rescued a man from a sinking vessel near Moresby Passage in stormy conditions. All remaining sailings from Tsawwassen to Swartz Bay were cancelled that night.

Notes

References 

Coastal-class ferries
Ships built in Flensburg
2007 ships